Cigaritis pinheyi is a butterfly in the family Lycaenidae. It is found in north-western Zambia and possibly the Democratic Republic of the Congo.

References

Butterflies described in 1983
Cigaritis